Khurja Assembly constituency is one of the 403 constituencies of the Uttar Pradesh Legislative Assembly, India. It is a part of the Bulandshahr district and one of the five assembly constituencies in the Gautam Buddha Nagar Lok Sabha constituency,. First election in this assembly constituency was held in 1952 after the "DPACO (1951)" (delimitation order) was passed in 1951. After the "Delimitation of Parliamentary and Assembly Constituencies Order" was passed in 2008, the constituency was assigned identification number 70. During the 01st and 02nd legislative assemblies, the constituency had two seats (MLAs) concurrently.

Wards / Areas
Extent of Khurja Assembly constituency is Khurja Tehsil.

Members of the Legislative Assembly

Election results

2022

2017

16th Vidhan Sabha: 2012 General Elections

See also
Bulandshahr Lok Sabha constituency
Gautam Budh Nagar district
Sixteenth Legislative Assembly of Uttar Pradesh
Uttar Pradesh Legislative Assembly

References

External links
 

Assembly constituencies of Uttar Pradesh
Khurja
Constituencies established in 1951